Marc Macedot (born 15 September 1988 in Garges-lès-Gonesse, France) is a French sprint athlete.

Achievements

References

1988 births
Living people
French male sprinters
Sportspeople from Val-d'Oise